Draginja Đipalović was a Serbian gymnast. She competed for Yugoslavia in the women's artistic team all-around at the 1948 Summer Olympics.

References

External links
 

Year of birth missing
Possibly living people
Serbian female artistic gymnasts
Olympic gymnasts of Yugoslavia
Gymnasts at the 1948 Summer Olympics
Place of birth missing